Baliospermum is a genus of plants under the family Euphorbiaceae first described as a genus in 1825. It is native to Southeast Asia and the Himalayas.

Species

Formerly included
moved to other genera: Cheilosa Trigonostemon

References

Codiaeae
Euphorbiaceae genera